Gabriel López Zapiain (22 April 1943 – 18 August 2018) was a Mexican footballer who played as a defender.

Career
Born in Irapuato, López Zapiain played for Irapuato and Guadalajara.

He earned one international cap for Mexico in 1971.

He later worked for Guadalajara as a coach and scout.

References

1943 births
2018 deaths
Mexican footballers
Mexico international footballers
Irapuato F.C. footballers
C.D. Guadalajara footballers
Liga MX players
People from Irapuato
Footballers from Guanajuato
Association football defenders